was a   after Chōwa and before Jian. This period spanned the years from April 1017 through February 1021.

Change of era
 1017 :  The era name was changed to mark an event or series of events. The previous era ended and a new one commenced in Chōwa 6, on the 23rd day of the 4th month of 1017.

Events of the Kannin era
 June 5, 1017 (Kannin 1, 9th day of the 5th month): The former-Emperor Sanjō died at the age of 42.
 January 22, 1018 (Kannin 2, 3rd day of the 1st month): The emperor celebrated his coming-of-age ceremony.

Notes

References
 Brown, Delmer M. and Ichirō Ishida, eds. (1979).  Gukanshō: The Future and the Past. Berkeley: University of California Press. ;  OCLC 251325323
 Nussbaum, Louis-Frédéric and Käthe Roth. (2005).  Japan encyclopedia. Cambridge: Harvard University Press. ;  OCLC 58053128
 Titsingh, Isaac. (1834). Nihon Odai Ichiran; ou,  Annales des empereurs du Japon.  Paris: Royal Asiatic Society, Oriental Translation Fund of Great Britain and Ireland. OCLC 5850691
 Varley, H. Paul. (1980). A Chronicle of Gods and Sovereigns: Jinnō Shōtōki of Kitabatake Chikafusa. New York: Columbia University Press. ;  OCLC 6042764

External links
 National Diet Library, "The Japanese Calendar" -- historical overview plus illustrative images from library's collection

Japanese eras